The 2021 Fermanagh Senior Football Championship was the 115th edition of the Fermanagh GAA's premier club Gaelic football tournament for senior clubs in County Fermanagh, Northern Ireland. The tournament consists of eight teams. The championship consists of 8 teams and had a straight knock-out format. The championship began on 8 October 2021.

Ederney St Joseph's entered the championship as defending champions.

Derrygonnelly Harps claimed their sixth title in seven years, and their ninth in total after defeating Enniskillen Gaels in the final.

Team changes
The following teams have changed division since the 2020 championship season.

To Championship
Promoted from 2020 Intermediate Championship
 Enniskillen Gaels - (Intermediate Champions)

From Championship
Relegated to 2021 Intermediate Championship
 Erne Gaels Belleek - (Relegation Play-off Losers)

Bracket

Quarter-finals
All 8 teams enter the competition at this stage. The four winners progress to the semi-finals while the four losers enter the relegation semi-finals.

Semi-finals

Final

Relegation play-offs

Relegation Semi-finals

Relegation Final

References

Fermanagh Senior Football Championship
Fermanagh SFC
Fermanagh Senior Football Championship